Roger Domenjoz (born 23 May 1923) was a Swiss basketball player. He competed in the men's tournament at the 1952 Summer Olympics.

References

External links
 

1923 births
Possibly living people
Swiss men's basketball players
Olympic basketball players of Switzerland
Basketball players at the 1952 Summer Olympics
Place of birth missing